Sede vacante ( in Latin) is a term for the state of a diocese while without a bishop. In the canon law of the Catholic Church, the term is used to refer to the vacancy of the bishop's or Pope's authority upon his death or resignation.

History 
Early in church history, the archpriest, archdeacon, and primicerius of the notaries in the papal court made a regency council which governed the sede vacante period.

It was the obligation of the Camerarius (papal chamberlain), the head of the Camera Apostolica, to formally establish the death of the pope. Gradually, this evolved in the theory that the Camerarius, as the chief of the curia, should conduct normal business even after the death of the pope, and also conduct the burial and the preparation for the new election. this process was evident with Camerarius Boso Breakspeare. During the long sede vacante of 1268 to 1271, the importance of the Camerarius was so clear that the Cardinals were ready to elect a new one if he died.

Vacancy of the Holy See

After the death or resignation of a pope, the Holy See enters a period of sede vacante. In this case the particular church is the Diocese of Rome and the "vacant seat" is the cathedra of Saint John Lateran, the cathedral church of the Bishop of Rome. During this period, the Holy See is administered by a regency of the College of Cardinals.

According to Universi Dominici gregis, the government of the Holy See and the administration of the Catholic Church during sede vacante falls to the College of Cardinals, but in a very limited capacity. At the same time, all the heads of the departments of the Roman Curia "cease to exercise" their offices. The exceptions are the Cardinal Camerlengo, who is charged with managing the property of the Holy See, and the Major Penitentiary, who continues to exercise his normal role. If either has to do something which normally requires the assent of the Pope, he has to submit it to the College of Cardinals. Papal legates continue to exercise their diplomatic roles overseas, and both the Vicar General of Rome and the Vicar General for the Vatican City State continue to exercise their pastoral role during this period. The postal administration of the Vatican City State prepares and issues special postage stamps for use during this particular period, known as "sede vacante stamps".

The coat of arms of the Holy See also changes during this period. The papal tiara over the keys is replaced with the umbraculum or ombrellino in Italian. This symbolizes both the lack of a Pope and the governance of the Camerlengo over the temporalities of the Holy See. As further indication, the Camerlengo ornaments his arms with this symbol during this period, which he subsequently removes once a pope is elected. Previously during this period the arms of the Camerlengo appeared on commemorative Vatican lira coinage. It now makes its appearance on Vatican euro coins, which are legal tender in all Eurozone states.

The interregnum is usually highlighted by the funeral Mass of the deceased pope, the general congregations of the College of Cardinals for determining the particulars of the election, and finally culminates in the papal conclave to elect a successor. Once a new pope has been elected (and ordained bishop if necessary) the sede vacante period officially ends, even before the papal inauguration.

Cardinals present in Rome are required to wait at least fifteen days after the start of the vacancy before they hold the conclave to elect the new Pope. After twenty days have elapsed, they must hold the conclave, even if some cardinals are missing. The period from the death of the Pope to the start of the conclave was often shorter but, after Cardinal William Henry O'Connell had arrived just too late for two conclaves in a row, Pius XI extended the time limit. With the next conclave in 1939, cardinals began to travel by air. Days before his resignation in February 2013, Benedict XVI amended the rules to allow the cardinals to begin the conclave sooner, if all voting cardinals are present. Historically, sede vacante periods have often been quite lengthy, lasting many months, or even years, due to lengthy deadlocked conclaves.

The most recent period of sede vacante of the Holy See began on 28 February 2013, after the resignation of Benedict XVI, and ended on 13 March 2013 with the election of Pope Francis, a period of 13 days.

The longest period without a Pope in the last 250 years was the approximately half year from the death in prison of Pius VI in 1799 and the election of Pius VII in Venice in 1800.

Extended sede vacante periods
Whilst conclaves and papal elections are generally completed in short order, there have been several periods when the papal chair has been vacant for months or even years.

The following table details sede vacante periods in excess of a year:

Sede vacante periods since 1799

Other Catholic dioceses
The term "sede vacante" can be applied to other Catholic dioceses and eparchies outside of Rome.  In such cases, this means that the particular diocesan bishop has either died, resigned, been transferred to a different diocese, or lost his office and a replacement has not yet been named.  If there is a coadjutor bishop for the diocese, then this period does not take place, as the coadjutor bishop (or coadjutor archbishop, in the case of an archdiocese) immediately succeeds to the episcopal see.

Within eight days after the episcopal see is known to be vacant, the college of consultors (or the cathedral chapter in some countries) is obliged to elect a diocesan administrator. The administrator they choose must be a priest or bishop who is at least 35 years old.

If the college of consultors fails to elect a qualifying person within the time allotted, the choice of diocesan administrator passes to the metropolitan archbishop or, if the metropolitan see is vacant, to the senior-most by appointment of the suffragan bishops.

Before the election of the diocesan administrator of a vacant see, the governance of the see is entrusted, with the powers of a vicar general, to the auxiliary bishop, if there is one, or to the senior among them, if there are several, otherwise to the college of consultors as a whole. The diocesan administrator has greater powers, essentially those of a bishop except for matters excepted by the nature of the matter or expressly by law. Canon law subjects his activity to various legal restrictions and to special supervision by the college of consultors (as for example canons 272 and 485).

Vicars general and episcopal vicars lose their powers sede vacante if they are not bishops; the vicars that are themselves bishops retain the powers they had before the see fell vacant, which they are to exercise under the authority of the administrator.

Other uses
The term has been adopted in Sedevacantism, an extreme strand of the Catholic traditionalist movement. Sedevacantists believe that all popes since the Second Vatican Council have been heretics, and that therefore the see of Rome is vacant.

See also

 Glossary of the Catholic Church
 Index of Catholic Church articles

Notes

References

External links

Catholic Church legal terminology
Election of the Pope
Latin legal terminology
Apostolic Camera